Jaworznik  is a village in the administrative district of Gmina Żarki, within Myszków County, Silesian Voivodeship, in southern Poland.

The village has a population of 750.

References

Jaworznik